Muvhango is a South African television soap opera, created by Duma Ndlovu. It is broadcast on the public TV channel SABC 2, and has an average of 4 million daily viewers. The first episode was aired on 7 April 1997. It was the first Tshivenda language TV drama, but later became multilingual in order to showcase that languages and cultures of South Africa should be used to unite rather than divide. The creator of Muvhango is Zulu by ancestry, but can speak Tshivenda and is fluent in all South African languages.

The show is built on a premise that "umuntu ngumuntu ngabantu" meaning that we exist within a context. The show has strong family orientated storylines that seeks to speak to the conflict between the traditional and the modern ways. The Vhakwevho's are the custodians of the traditional side of things while the Johannesburg lot focuses on the modern ways.

In 2006 the series was nominated for the South African Film and Television Award for best soap opera.

Maumela Mahuwa is currently the longest-serving cast member on the show. She has been on Muvhango since the show's inception in 1997. Behind her is Elsie Rasalanavho who played the role of Vho-Mulondeleli Mukwevho from 1997 - 2022 and Sindi Dlathu who played the role of Thandaza Mokoena from 1997 - 2018. They are followed by Dingaan Khumalo and Gabriel Temudzani, who've both been on the show since 2000. Dingaan Khumalo has the role of businessman James Motsamai and Gabriel Temudzani has the role of Chief Azwindini Mukwevho, the Chief of Thathe. Maumela Mahuwa has the role of Nurse Susan Mukwevho, the former senior wife of the Chief of Thathe and currently Mayor of Thathe.

Plot
The show is primarily set in Johannesburg and Venda. In Johannesburg, Thandaza Mokoena (Sindi Dlathu), James Motsamai (Dingaan Khumalo), Khakhathi Mulaudzi, Gugu Nkosi-Zikalala, Imani Nkosi, Hangwani Mukhwevho, Rendani Mukhwevho, their families and their colleagues deal with nepotism, drama and violence in the corporate world. In Venda, the Mukhwevho family leads the people of Thathe while there are cracks in their family. Thandaza left her business over to James the Qalabosha constructions

Cast

The Mukwevho Family, MMC and Qalabosha Constructions
The Mukwevho family is one of the highest royal families in Venda. Azwindini was the chief and had 4 wives (Susan, Pfuluwani, Vele and Mpho). Vho-Masindi is the Queen Mother and the Chief's mother. Vho-Makhadzi is the matriarch of the family by blood and Vho-Gizara is the younger brother of Vho-Makhadzi and is Azwindini's Royal Advisor. Vho-Makhadzi, Vho-Gizara, Vho-Borosi and Vho-Phusuphusu are siblings and their brothers Vho-Albert, Vho-Mushasha and Vho-Mashudu (Azwindini's father) all died.

Vho-Hangwani is Albert's widow and Rendani is her daughter. Hangwani and Rendani both reside in Johannesburg but go to Venda for family gatherings. Hangwani owns coffee shop Dukathole and Rendani works at the family business, MMC. Vho-Mukondeleli is Vho-Mushasha's widow and Mulalo is her grandson. Mulalo has been fighting for the throne for a long time and was even bewitched to show that he isn't entitled to the throne. In a surprising turn of events, Mulalo became the chief of Thathe.

Thandaza was the first woman from the Vha-Kwevho family to ever get a corporate job whereas Senior Royal Wife Susan chose to become a nurse in Venda. Teboho Mukwevho became the owner of a well known local restaurant but she decided to sell it. Thandaza, Susan and Teboho are the only women from the Mukwevho family who are independent and have steady jobs.

MMC

Mukwevho Mulaudzi Constructions (formerly known as Mukwevho Mojalefa Constructions) is the Mukwevho family business. Azwindini's father and his brother Albert used to travel a lot and they started a construction company in Joburg for their families in Venda. The CEO was previously Thandaza Mokoena, who was Edward Mukwevho's widow until she started her own rival business, Basadi Constructions (now called Qalabosha).

The current CEO is Gugu Nkosi-Zikalala with KK Mulaudzi as the company's majority shareholder and Tenda Mudau as the Chairperson of the board. Rendani normally acts as her family's proxy in board meetings.

Qalabosha Constructions

Renowned businesswoman Thandaza Buthelezi  (played by Sindi Dlathu) left MMC with business tycoon Lerumo Mojalefa who was the company's chairperson and her close friend James Motsamai to start their own company (Basadi Constructions).  However, Lerumo and Thandaza left and they left the company in James' hands. He changed the name to Qalabosha Constructions when he married Moliehi Zikalala. James is the Chairperson and CEO of Qalabosha.

References

South African drama television series
2000s South African television series
2010s South African television series
1990s South African television series
1997 South African television series debuts